Los Padres National Forest is a United States national forest in southern and central California. Administered by the United States Forest Service, Los Padres includes most of the mountainous land along the California coast from Ventura to Monterey, extending inland.

Geography

The forest is divided into two non-contiguous areas separated approximately 40 to 50 miles from one another. The northern division lies within Monterey County and includes the Big Sur Coast and its scenic interior areas. The Ventana Wilderness in this division includes the Sisquoc Condor Sanctuary, created in 1937, which is the oldest designated sanctuary for the large endangered birds.

The larger, so called main section of Los Padres lies further south, within San Luis Obispo, Santa Barbara, Ventura and Kern Counties, with a small extension into Los Angeles County in the Pyramid Lake area, between Castaic and Gorman. The Santa Ynez Mountains, which are within the Los Padres, rise above the Gaviota Coast, a series of alluvial plains along the last undeveloped stretch of the Southern California coastline. Other mountain ranges within the Los Padres include the Santa Lucia Mountains, La Panza Range, Caliente Range (a small part), Sierra Madre Mountains, San Rafael Mountains, and Topatopa Mountains; the highest parts of the forest are not within named mountain ranges, but are adjacent to the western San Emigdio Mountains and include Mount Pinos, Cerro Noroeste, and Reyes Peak. The forest is also adjacent to the Angeles National Forest, which is in Los Angeles County in Southern California and is nearby Carrizo Plain National Monument in eastern San Luis Obispo County. Forest headquarters are located in Goleta, California. There are local ranger district offices in Frazier Park, King City, Ojai, Santa Barbara, and Santa Maria.

Many rivers in Southern and Central California have their points of origin within the Los Padres National Forest, including the Carmel, Salinas, Cuyama, Sisquoc, Santa Ynez, Coyote Creek, Sespe, Ventura, and Piru.

Several wilderness areas have been set aside within the Los Padres National Forest, including the San Rafael Wilderness, the first primitive area to be included in the U.S. wilderness system after the passage of the Wilderness Act in 1964. Another large wilderness created in the 1970s was the Ventana Wilderness in the Santa Lucia Mountains. A total of 48% of the total area within the forest has a wilderness designation.

Wilderness areas

 San Rafael Wilderness
 Ventana Wilderness
 Garcia Wilderness ( in the Lucia District)
 Santa Lucia Wilderness ( in the Lucia District, in the Santa Lucia Mountains)
 Machesna Mountain Wilderness (in the La Panza Range in San Luis Obispo County)
 Silver Peak Wilderness (in the Monterey District)
 Dick Smith Wilderness ( in the Santa Barbara Ranger District)
 Chumash Wilderness ( in the Mt. Pinos Ranger District, just west of Mount Pinos)
 Sespe Wilderness (in both the Ojai and Mt. Pinos Ranger Districts)
 Matilija Wilderness ( in the Ojai Ranger District)

Recreation areas
Parts of the National Forest are designated as recreation areas. There are three recreation areas,
 Figueroa Mountain Recreation Area
 Sage Hill Group Recreation Area
 Santa Ynez Recreation Area, in the Santa Barbara Ranger District.

Wildlife and vegetation

Many threatened and endangered species live within the forest. Among them is the California condor (Gymnogyps californianus), for whom the United States Forest Service established the Sespe Condor Sanctuary. Also present is the California mountain kingsnake, a California species of special concern. The American peregrine falcon is also entirely dependent on the forest for its survival.  The mountain lion and California mule deer may be the most common large mammals. Bighorn sheep inhabit the Sespe Creek region of the forest. American black bears browse on grasses, berries, and carrion. Coyotes thrive everywhere in this forest. Bobcats can occasionally be seen in the more remote mountainous areas of the forest. Other animals found in this forest are raccoons, bluebirds, barn owls, red-tailed hawks, cottontail rabbits, bald eagles, jack rabbits, California quail, California scrub jays, and great horned owls.

It consists largely of Jeffrey pine (Pinus jeffreyi) forests, although old-growth coast redwood (Sequoia Sempervirens), coast Douglas-fir (Pseudotsuga menziesii var. menziesii), and white fir (Abies concolor) are also found there. In 2008, scientist J. Michael Fay published a map of old growth redwoods in and around Big Sur as a result of his transect of the entire redwood range.

Resource extraction and fire prevention
The U.S. Forest Service decided in May 2020 to thin  of land to reduce wildfire risk most of which is within the national forest. The decision memo states the project aims to “to improve forest health by reducing mortality risk, provide safe and effective locations from which to perform fire suppression operations, to slow the spread of a wildland fire”. The site is roughly 30 miles north of Ojai in the Reyes Peak area on Pine Mountain in Ventura County. Seven environmental groups, the city of Ojai and Ventura County filed three lawsuits in federal court in April 2022 to stop the brush clearance and logging operation.

Access

Due to the fire risk, there are seasonal restrictions on building fires.  Some portions of the forest are closed entirely to public entry during the peak fire season, which usually extends from around June 1 to mid-November.

A National Forest Adventure Pass is required for parking in most locations of the Los Padres National Forest, as well as other National Forests in Southern California. The pass is not required in the Monterey Ranger District including Ventana Wilderness and Silver Peak Wilderness.

Restrictions were put in place at times during the COVID-19 pandemic due to crowded conditions in which people were unable to social distance and also the resulting litter and human waste that was left behind.

History

 means "the Fathers", referring to the Catholic missionary priests of the Spanish missions who proselytized in and around the area in the 18th and 19th centuries.

Los Padres was named Santa Barbara National Forest until December 3, 1936, and was assembled from a number of smaller National Forests, including:
Monterey National Forest (est. June 25, 1906), absorbed by Santa Barbara on August 18, 1919, and which itself had absorbed:
Pinnacles National Forest (est. July 18, 1906)
San Benito National Forest (est. October 26, 1907)
San Luis National Forest (est. July 1, 1908), which had absorbed part of:
San Luis Obispo National Forest (est. June 25, 1906)
San Gabriel National Forest (part) (est. December 20, 1892)
Pine Mountain and Zaka Lake Forest Reserve, (est. March 2, 1898) combined with Santa Ynez on December 22, 1903, to create Santa Barbara Forest Reserve
Santa Ynez Forest Reserve, (est. October 2, 1899)

After the consolidation of the forests, the name Santa Barbara Forest  was resented by residents of the other counties for being too closely identified with just the one county. Amidst public pressure, administrators therefore changed the name to Los Padres to be more representative of the regional history.

Fires

Due to the very dry summers, forest fires in Los Padres National Forest are always a risk. In 1965, a truck driven by country singer Johnny Cash caught fire, and burned several hundred acres in Ventura county. In August 1977, the Marble Cone Fire burned  within the Ventana Wilderness and other portions of the Los Padres Forest. In June and July, 2008, the Basin Complex Fire torched  in the same region.

The Thomas Fire was a massive wildfire that traversed the forest within Ventura and Santa Barbara Counties. It was one of multiple wildfires that ignited in southern California in December 2017. The unusually strong and persistent Santa Ana winds were the largest factor in the spread of the fire. The region experienced an on-and-off Santa Ana wind event for a little over two weeks, which contributed to the Thomas Fire's persistent growths in size. At its height, the wildfire was powerful enough to generate its own weather, qualifying it as a firestorm.

The Forest Service conducts prescribed burns when favorable weather conditions are present; temperatures must be below 80 degrees, winds lower than 15 miles per hour and relative humidity needs to be above 20 percent.

Marijuana grows

Illegal farming of cannabis in secluded areas has been a problem for a long time in the forest. The practice continues under legalization as the crops are produced for the unregulated market without testing for the illegal pesticides they may be contaminated with. These operations often use pesticides and leave piles of trash such as drip irrigation tubing.

See also
 Camp Scheideck, California

References

External links

Los Padres National Forest: US Forest Service official site
Los Padres ForestWatch - a nonprofit organization working to protect and restore the natural and cultural heritage of the Los Padres National Forest
Ventana Wilderness Alliance- dedicated to the preservation of wilderness areas and other public lands in the Monterey Ranger District of the Los Padres National Forest
Mountain Biking in the Los Padres National Forest- a website with maps, descriptions & links of various routes through the forest for wilderness camping on a mountain bike.

 
National Forests of California
Protected areas of Los Angeles County, California
Protected areas of Kern County, California
Protected areas of Monterey County, California
Protected areas of San Luis Obispo County, California
Protected areas of Santa Barbara County, California
Protected areas of Ventura County, California
California Coast Ranges
Transverse Ranges
Protected areas of Southern California

Campgrounds in California
Big Sur
Protected areas established in 1936
1936 establishments in California